Clive Joy-Morancho (born 1958 in Zimbabwe) is a British formed aviation tycoon and luxury car collector, resident in Marsella. He was also a competition driver.

References

1958 births
Living people
Zimbabwean businesspeople
British racing drivers